Aikenton is an unincorporated community in Jasper County, in the U.S. state of Georgia.

History
A post office called Aikenton was established in 1890, and remained in operation until 1915. Aikenton had 136 inhabitants in 1900.

References

Unincorporated communities in Jasper County, Georgia
Unincorporated communities in Georgia (U.S. state)